Annick may refer to:
Alnwick, Northumberland, England (pronounced "Annick")
, a coaster (ship) in service with J Campbell Ltd, Irvine, 1947-54
Annick Horiuchi, French historian of mathematics
Annick Loiseau (born 1957), French physicist
Annick Petrus (born 1961), French Saint Martinois politician
Annick Press, a Canadian publisher

See also
Annick Water, tributary of the River Irvine, Ayrshire, Scotland
Annick ward, local authority area of Scotland, covering Stewarton
Annick Lodge and Greenville, a country estate in North Ayrshire, Scotland